Seaton Park is a neighborhood-named pocket park located on National Park Service property at south of Massachusetts Avenue and north of I Street NW between 5th and 6th St NW in the Chinatown neighborhood of Washington, D.C.  It is also referred to as Chinatown Park.

References

Parks in Washington, D.C.
National Mall and Memorial Parks